Brian Doherty is an American drummer, singer-songwriter, composer, music producer, and educator based in New York City. After starting his career as a member of the rock bands The Silos and They Might Be Giants, he has also worked with artists such as XTC, Freedy Johnston, and Ben Folds and contributed to movie soundtracks. As of 2014 he has released three albums of royalty-free drum tracks for songwriters, and in 2012 released his debut solo project, Treat + Release.

Early life, education
Born in Brooklyn, Doherty began playing drums at the age of seven. Growing up in Randolph, New Jersey, early on he listened avidly to rock bands such as The Outlaws, Lynyrd Skynyrd, and Led Zeppelin. Doherty went on to play drums in his high school marching band, percussion ensemble, and a number of garage rock bands.

He attended the Manhattan School of Music for both his undergraduate and graduate degree, studying under musicians such as Paul Price and Fred Hinger. He graduated with a Master of Music degree.

Music career

Early years
After graduating college Doherty began touring with Jonathan Butler and jazz artists like Noel Pointer and Lonnie Liston Smith. He was also a member of Second Nature and the Bob Baldwin/Al Orlo Project featuring James Robinson. Around this time, Doherty also joined the faculty at NYC’s Drummers Collective, where he remained for the next thirteen years.

The Silos

In 1990 Doherty became a member of New York rock band The Silos by RCA Records. Doherty contributed to their 1990 self-titled studio album The Silos which led to the band's network TV debut appearance on Late Night with David Letterman. It peaked at #141 on the US Billboard 200 chart.

Salas-Humara quit the band following the release of The Silos. Subsequent Silos albums Doherty contributed to include Hasta La Victoria (1992), Susan Across The Ocean (1994), and Long Green Boat  in 1997.

While still periodically recording and touring with the band, Doherty also worked as a session drummer for artists such as singer-songwriters Freedy Johnston and Ben Folds. He appeared on Johnston's break-out album   Can You Fly  in 1992, and the album received highly favorable praise, earning 4.5/5 from Allmusic.

They Might Be Giants

In the early 1990s, Brian was recruited by They Might Be Giants. He was their second live drummer following Jonathan Feinberg, and their first studio drummer. For three years Doherty and TMBG recorded several albums, co-wrote songs, and toured internationally. His first release with the band was for their 1993 EP Why Does the Sun Shine?.  In August 1994, he contributed to their Back to Skull EP, shortly followed by their full album John Henry .

John Henry was their first album to utilize a full band arrangement, rather than synthesized and programmed backing tracks. The album's name, a reference to the man versus machine fable of John Henry, is an allusion to the band's fundamental switch to more conventional instrumentation, especially the newly established use of a human drummer instead of a drum machine. John Henry is TMBG's longest record and was the band's highest-charting adult album, having peaked at #61 on the Billboard 200, until 2011's Join Us, which peaked at #32.

Later he played on their 1996 album Factory Showroom, and their 1998 live album Severe Tire Damage.

Session musician
After leaving They Might Be Giants, Doherty went on to work with groups and artists such as M2M, Frank Black of The Pixies, Twyla Tharp, XTC, Freedy Johnston, Christy Thompson, Madder Rose, Simone Hardy, Chip Taylor, Mono Puff, John Platania, Sol Seppy, Guy Davis, Gary Lucas, Haruko Nara, Jon Langford of The Mekons, and John Linnell. Doherty has also produced a number of recordings including Ms. Lum’s Airport Love Song, described by Billboard as "exquisitely wrought."

In 1995 he contributed to   A Testimonial Dinner: The Songs of XTC   by Thirsty Ear Records. In 1999 he contributed additional drums to the album  State Songs  by former bandmate John Linnell. The album spent four weeks on the CMJ 200 chart, peaking at #18.

In 2000 Doherty went back to graduate school at the City College of New York. After earning a Master's degree in Elementary Education, he became a classroom teacher as part of the New York City Teaching Fellows program, teaching music in the South Bronx.

In addition to being a full-time music teacher, Doherty has been able to maintain a stake in the music business.  In 2000 he drummed on albums for artists and labels including Chip Taylor, Bloodshot Records, John Platania, Jon Langford, Guy Davis , and P. J. Pacifico. In 2006 he drummed on   The Bells of 1 2  by Sol Seppy. He has also remained active as a drummer playing private events and Broadway shows. He’s worked on the Broadway productions of RENT, Hairspray, and Little Shop of Horrors. He also drummed in the debut of the Broadway show The Times They Are A-Changin' in October 2006 at the Brooks Atkinson Theater in New York City. In 2009 he provided drums for the Guy Davis album Sweetheart Like You.

Keep it Simple series
In December 2010, Doherty released Keep It Simple, Volume 1, a CD of royalty-free drum-track recordings. Volume 2 was released in early 2011, with each of the fourteen tracks around three minutes and "performed by Doherty in a single take," without any editing or digital enhancement. Volume 3 was released on October 15, 2012.

According to Doherty, the tracks are largely intended to provide an organic drum line for producers and songwriters. He has stated that "most loops [on the market] are only short segments and are sometimes too...complex to be truly helpful. I wanted to create a collection of drum tracks similar to what you might expect from drummers like Mick Fleetwood or Jeff Porcaro, while remaining faithful to my style and musical instincts."

Treat + Release (2012)

In 2012 Doherty teamed up with two other long-term session musicians, guitarist Todd Novak and bassist John Yates, to form the rock 'n roll solo project Treat + Release, with Doherty handling drums and vocals.

Later that year Doherty released the pop and rock studio album Treat + Release, his first solo release. The nine-track album was recorded on 2" tape, and beyond Novak and Yates has supporting musicians such as singer-songwriters Marshall Crenshaw and Mike Viola, Robert Curiano of Mink DeVille, and bassist Tony Maimone.

In October 2012 he was the feature of a short film titled "Who The F** is Brian Doherty," which looked at his career in the music industry and future plans.

Discography

Solo albums

Keep it Simple drum track series
2010: Keep it Simple Volume 1
2011: Keep it Simple Volume 2
2012: Keep it Simple Volume 3

Collaborations

With The Silos
1990: The Silos
1993: Hasta La Victoria! 
1994:   Susan Across the Ocean 
1997: Long Green Boat

With They Might Be Giants

1993: Why Does the Sun Shine? EP
1994: Back to Skull EP
1994: John Henry
1996: Factory Showroom
1998: Severe Tire Damage
1999: Long Tall Weekend
2002: Dial-A-Song: 20 Years of They Might Be Giants (compilation)
2005:  A User's Guide to They Might Be Giants  (compilation)
2005:   They Got Lost  (compilation)

Production/performance credits

See also
They Might Be Giants

Further reading

Brian Doherty discography at Allmusic

References

External links

American session musicians
Living people
Year of birth missing (living people)
American rock drummers
They Might Be Giants members
The Silos members